Canisia Lubrin (born 1984) is a writer, critic, professor, poet and editor. Originally from St. Lucia, Lubrin now lives in Whitby, Ontario, Canada.

Life and career 
Lubrin was born in St. Lucia and studied in Canada, completing a bachelor's degree at York University and a graduate degree in creative writing at the University of Guelph.

Her first collection of poems, Voodoo Hypothesis, was published in 2017 by Wolsak & Wynn. Voodoo Hypothesis rejects the contemporary and historical systems that paint black people as inferior. The book also addresses the legacy of slavery in Lubrin's native Caribbean. Voodoo Hypothesis was nominated for the Gerald Lampert award, the Pat Lowther award and was a finalist for the Raymond Souster award. In addition Voodoo Hypothesis was named one of 2017's best books in Canadian poetry by CBC Books and one of the 10 "must-read" books of 2017 by the League of Canadian Poets. CBC Books also named Lubrin a Black Canadian writer to watch in 2018.

Lubrin's short story Into Timmins is anthologized in The Unpublished City: Vol. I, edited by Dionne Brand, finalist for the 2018 Toronto Book Awards.

In addition to her career as a poet, Lubrin is Assistant Professor in The School of English and Theatre Studies at The University of Guelph. She was appointed the Inaugural Shaftesbury Writer in Residence of Victoria College at the University of Toronto and worked as an editor with Buckrider Books, an imprint of Canadian independent press Wolsak & Wynn from 2018 to 2021. She was also a director of the Pivot Reading Series, a biweekly poetry reading series in Toronto. For 2017–2018, Lubrin was a Writer-in-Residence with Poetry In Voice. In 2021, publisher McClelland & Stewart announced Lubrin as their new poetry editor.

Lubrin's second collection of poetry, The Dyzgraphxst, was published by McClelland & Stewart in 2020.

In 2021, Lubrin was named one of two winners, alongside Natalie Scenters-Zapico, of the Windham-Campbell Literature Prize in poetry. Dionne Brand was also named a winner of the Windham-Campbell prize in the fiction category, the first time in the history of that award that two Canadians were named as laureates in the same year.

The Dyzgraphxst was shortlisted for four book prizes, including the Governor General's Award for English-language poetry at the 2020 Governor General's Awards, and for the 2020 Trillium Book Award for Poetry. The book also won four awards, including the overall OCM Bocas Prize for Caribbean Literature, the Derek Walcott Prize and the 2021 Griffin Poetry Prize.

Works 
 Augur: poems, Gap Riot Press, 2017. 
 Voodoo Hypothesis : poems Buckrider Books, 2017. 
 The Dyzgraphxst : a poem, McClelland & Stewart, 2020.

References

External links
Interview with Canisia Lubrin by The Poetry Extension

1984 births
21st-century Canadian poets
21st-century Canadian short story writers
21st-century Canadian women writers
21st-century Saint Lucian poets
Black Canadian women
Black Canadian writers
Canadian women poets
Canadian women short story writers
Living people
Saint Lucian emigrants to Canada
Saint Lucian women poets
University of Guelph alumni
York University alumni